Strata Tower is a forty-story luxury residential building in Abu Dhabi, designed by New York-based architects Hani Rashid and Lise Anne Couture of Asymptote Architecture, currently being built on Al Raha Beach. Construction has begun and it was scheduled for completion by 2013. It is being developed by Aldar Properties.

Overview
Strata Tower was planned to have a height of 160 meters to dominate the skyline of the Al Dana precinct. Asymptote designed the tower to have a curvilinear exterior, with a cantilevered exoskeleton structure which allows much light into the interior.

See also
 Strata SE1, building of the same name in London

References

External links
 Asymptote Architecture Strata Tower Page

Buildings and structures in Abu Dhabi